Lakeside Lightning is an NBL1 West club based in Perth, Western Australia. The club fields a team in both the Men's and Women's NBL1 West. The club is owned and managed by Lakeside Baptist Church. The Lightning play their home games at Lakeside Recreation Centre.

Club history

Background
The Lakeside Lightning basketball program was established by the Lakeside Baptist Church in 1995 when teams were first entered into the junior state league, the Western Australian Basketball League (WABL).

Grand final defeats (2000–2002)
The Lakeside Lightning made their debut in the State Basketball League (SBL) in 2000 in the form of a men's team. The Lightning finished their inaugural season in third place on the Men's SBL's Sky Conference ladder with a 12–7 record. They advanced through to the MSBL Grand Final, where they faced the Geraldton Buccaneers. In the championship decider on 1 September, the Lightning were defeated 96–76 despite a 21-point effort from American guard Ryan Borowicz.

In 2001, a Lakeside Lightning women's team entered the Women's SBL. In just their second season, the women finished the regular season in fourth place with a 15–7 record and advanced through to the 2002 WSBL Grand Final, where they faced the Perry Lakes Hawks. In the championship decider on 20 September, the Lightning were defeated 84–55, with American centre Jenny Crouse scoring a team-high 19 points.

String of championships (2005–2011)
In 2005, the men's team made their first MSBL Grand Final since 2000. There they faced a Perry Lakes Hawks team looking for a fifth straight title. In the title decider on 27 August, the Lightning defeated the Hawks 97–88 in overtime to win their first MSBL Championship. American forward Andy Gilbert was named Grand Final MVP for his 36 points.

In 2006, both teams made grand final appearances, with the club claiming an SBL championship double. In the WSBL championship decider on 8 September, the Lightning defeated the Mandurah Magic 56–53 behind a Grand Final MVP performance from American guard-forward Kristi Channing. In the MSBL championship decider a night later, the Lightning defeated the Goldfields Giants 83–66 behind a Grand Final MVP performance from American guard Ben Earle. Earle had 32 points in the win.

In 2007, the men won their first ever minor premiership after finishing the regular season in first place with a 20–4 record. They went on to reach their third straight MSBL Grand Final, where they were defeated 96–94 by the Goldfields Giants. American guard-forwards Charleston Long (31 points & 13 rebounds) and Aaron Shaw (29 points) led the way for the Lightning in the loss, while centre Jarrad Prue had 18 rebounds.

In 2009, the men won their second minor premiership after finishing the regular season in first place with a 22–4 record. They went on to reach their fourth MSBL Grand Final in five years, and once again faced the Perry Lakes Hawks. In the championship decider on 22 August, the Lightning defeated the Hawks 85–77 behind a Grand Final MVP performance from American guard Luke Payne. Payne had 29 points in the win.

In 2010, the men won their third minor premiership after finishing the regular season in first place with a 21–5 record. They went on to reach their fifth MSBL Grand Final in six years, where they were defeated 107–96 by the Willetton Tigers despite Luke Payne's team-high 22 points.

In 2011, the men failed to reach the grand final despite claiming their third straight minor premiership with a team-best 24–2 record. During the year, they had an 18-game winning streak.

Further success (2013–2014)
In 2013, the men won their fifth minor premiership in seven years after finishing the regular season in first place with a 23–3 record. They advanced through the first two rounds of the finals undefeated to reach their seventh MSBL Grand Final. In the championship decider on 31 August, the Lightning defeated the Wanneroo Wolves 77–74 behind a Grand Final MVP performance from American forward Justin Cecil. Cecil had 25 points and seven rebounds in helping the Lightning claim their fourth MSBL Championship.

In 2014, the women had their best-ever regular season campaign in their 14-year history, finishing in second place with a 19–3 record. Behind American forward Kari Pickens, the Lightning advanced through to their first WSBL Grand Final since 2006. In the championship decider on 29 August, the Lightning were defeated by the Rockingham Flames 80–75 despite Pickens registering 25 points, eight rebounds and five assists.

Fall from grace (2015)
In 2015, the women's team went from grand finalists to wooden spooners after winning just one game to be clear on the bottom of the standings. The men, meanwhile, were also in unfamiliar territory. Their 13-year run of making the finals ended in 2015 as they finished in 12th position with a 9–17 record while losing their last seven matches. Since joining the SBL in 2000, the Lightning had been a powerful force in the men's competition, never going through a season winning single-digit games. In the previous 15 seasons, the men had won four championships, five minor premierships and their worst record in those 15 years was 11–15 when they last missed the finals in 2001.

Return to prominence (2018)
In 2018, the women's team set a new all-time best regular-season campaign, as they were crowned minor premiers for the first time with a first-place finish and a 21–1 record. They went on to reach their fourth WSBL Grand Final and first since 2014 after going undefeated over the first two rounds of the finals. In the championship decider on 31 August, the Lightning defeated the Mandurah Magic 75–64 to win their second WSBL Championship. They delivered a remarkable final five minutes to come from 10 points behind to score the last 21 points of the match. American guard Alison Schwagmeyer was named Grand Final MVP for her performance, with 25 points, seven rebounds and three assists.

NBL1 West (2021–present)
In 2021, the SBL was rebranded as NBL1 West.

Accolades
Women
Championships: 2 (2006, 2018)
Grand Final appearances: 4 (2002, 2006, 2014, 2018)
Minor premierships: 2 (2018, 2019)

Men
Championships: 4 (2005, 2006, 2009, 2013)
Grand Final appearances: 7 (2000, 2005, 2006, 2007, 2009, 2010, 2013)
Minor premierships: 5 (2007, 2009, 2010, 2011, 2013)

References

External links
 Lakeside's official website

Basketball teams in Western Australia
NBL1 West teams
Basketball teams established in 2000
2000 establishments in Australia